Crestone Needle is a high mountain summit of the Crestones in the Sangre de Cristo Range of the Rocky Mountains of North America. The Crestones are a cluster of high summits in the Sangre de Cristo Range, comprising Crestone Peak, Crestone Needle, Kit Carson Peak, Challenger Point, Humboldt Peak, and Columbia Point. They are usually accessed from common trailheads.

Climbing
While not as high as Crestone Peak, and connected to it by a high, jagged ridge, Crestone Needle is regarded as a worthy climb in its own right. The easiest route is the South Face (or South Couloir), usually accessed via Broken Hand Pass from South Colony Lakes. This is a slightly exposed scramble with a few tricky moves, and is one of the more difficult standard routes among the Colorado fourteeners. However the classic route on the mountain is the Ellingwood Arete, also known as the Ellingwood Ledges Route. This is a steep ridge on the northeast side of the peak, leading directly up from the Upper South Colony Lake basin to the summit. It is a mildly technical rock climb (5.7 on the Yosemite Decimal Scale). It is particularly popular because of its inclusion in the well-known book Fifty Classic Climbs of North America by Steve Roper and Allen Steck.

The peak consists mainly of granite and conglomerate. Knobby handholds are frequent near the summit. Snow fields linger around the peak throughout the summer.

Almost all fatalities on the peak occur on either the Class 4 traverse from Crestone Peak or the technical Ellingwood Ledges Route.

See also

List of mountain peaks of Colorado
List of Colorado fourteeners

References

External links

 
 
 

Mountains of Colorado
Mountains of Custer County, Colorado
Mountains of Saguache County, Colorado
Fourteeners of Colorado
North American 4000 m summits
Sangre de Cristo Mountains